Fanny Altenburger (born in 2000) is an Austrian actress.

Life and career 
The daughter of the actress Julia Stemberger and the violinist Christian Altenburger, she gained her first film experience in 2010 with Jud Süß - Film ohne Gewissen at the side of Tobias Moretti and Martina Gedeck, who played her parents.

In 2016, she appeared in the film Wir töten Stella by Julian Pölsler. In 2018, she completed school with the Matura. In the television series Counterpart, she played the role of Ethel in 2018. She performed in the play Honig im Kopf by  based on the eponymous film by Til Schweiger.

Filmography (selection) 
 2010: Jud Süß – Film ohne Gewissen
 2010: Tom Turbo – The horse of the princess
 2010: Schnell ermittelt – Viktor Zacharias
 2016: SOKO Donau – Ausgeklinkt
 2017: Schnell ermittelt – Carlo Michalek
 2017: Wir töten Stella
 2018: Die letzte Party deines Lebens
 2018–2019: Counterpart (TV series)

References

External links 

 
 
 
 Fanny Altenburger rietz-casting-agentur.de

2000 births
Living people
21st-century Austrian actresses
Austrian stage actresses
Austrian child actresses
Austrian film actresses